Satanskoraal is a 1959 South African action film directed by Elmo De Witt and produced by Jamie Uys for Jamie Uys Filmproduksies. It is the first South African movie to be filmed underwater.

The film's plot revolves around a rich playboy and an expert in coral who helps scientists to discover chunks of coral missing off the Mozambican coast. The film stars Ponie de Wet in the lead role along with Tessa Laubscher, Gabriel Bayman and Lindea Bosman in supporting roles.

Plot
 Ponie de Wet as himself
 Tessa Laubscher as Anita Dumont
 Gabriel Bayman as Gamat Slingers
 Lindea Bosman as Miss Malan
 Desmond Varaday as Boss
 Jan Bruyns as du Plooy
 Willie Herbst as Henchman
 Felix Sevell as Henchman
 Peter Chiswell as Consul's Secretary
 Dana Niehaus as Foreign Affairs Official
 Hans Kaniuk as van Wyk

References

External links
 

1950s adventure drama films
South African black-and-white films
South African adventure drama films
Afrikaans-language films
1950s English-language films
English-language South African films
1950s Portuguese-language films
Films featuring underwater diving
1950s multilingual films
South African multilingual films